Jack James Walton (born 23 April 1998) is an English professional footballer who plays as a goalkeeper for EFL Championship club Luton Town.

Club career
Walton started his youth career with Bolton Wanderers' Academy before switching to Barnsley in 2013, where he was named Academy Player of the year for 2014–15. In August 2015, he signed his first professional contract with the club, of three years.

On 25 January 2016, Walton was loaned out to Conference North club Stalybridge Celtic on a 28-day youth loan. He made his debut the same day in a goalless draw with Curzon Ashton.

Walton returned to Stalybridge Celtic on 22 September 2017 for one month, during which he played eight times and kept three clean sheets. Upon returning to his parent club, he said "I really enjoyed my time with Stalybridge and I can't thank them enough for taking the chance on me to play for them". In January 2018, he was reloaned to Stalybridge Celtic for the remainder of the season, but was recalled in March and was named on the bench for a Championship match at home to Millwall. He made a brief return to Stalybridge before, on 24 April 2018, making his debut for Barnsley in a 3–0 league defeat against Nottingham Forest. He went on to play twice more during the season, and kept a clean sheet in a 2–0 victory over Brentford.

On 2 July 2018, Walton signed a two-year contract extension with Barnsley.
On 13 August 2020, Walton signed a new three-year contract extension with Barnsley.

Career statistics

Style of play
Barnsley manager Lee Johnson has described Walton as a player who is technically good and has good character.

References

External links
Jack Walton at Barnsley F.C. website

1998 births
Living people
Association football goalkeepers
Footballers from Bury, Greater Manchester
English footballers
Barnsley F.C. players
Stalybridge Celtic F.C. players
National League (English football) players
Northern Premier League players
English Football League players